The fourth season of Românii au talent aired on ProTV from 14 February 2014. ProTV kept the same team, Smiley and Pavel Bartoș presenters, Andra, Mihai Petre and Andi Moisescu jurors.

Semi-finals

Semi-final 1 (11 April)

Semi-final 2 (18 April)

Semi-final 3 (25 April)

Semi-final 4 (2 May)

Semi-final 5 (9 May)

Final (16 May)

References

External links
 Romanii au talent at protv.ro

Românii au talent
2014 Romanian television seasons